The Nure (Latin Nura) is a small river in northern Italy (province of Piacenza).

The upper valley is somewhat influenced by the sea air, keeping it free of fog and strong winds, and therefore relatively pleasant even during the winter months.

In this valley there are 79 fortifications (castles, fortified towers and dwellings, etc.)

The main villages along this river are: Ferriere, Bosconure, Cantoniera, Farini d'Olmo, Bettola, Ponte dell'Olio, Vigolzone, Grazzano Visconti, Podenzano.

In addition to the main villages, other areas of the Val Nure (Valley of the Nure) are delineated by parishes, with churches located along the peaks of the mountains. One example is Cogno San Bassano, at the top of the mountain above Farini d'Olmo.

References

Rivers of Italy
Rivers of the Province of Piacenza
Rivers of the Apennines